Ji-yoon, also spelled Jee-yoon, Ji-yun, or Ji-youn, is a Korean unisex given name. The meaning differs based on the hanja used to write each syllable of the name. There are 46 hanja with the reading "ji" and 16 hanja with the reading "yoon" on the South Korean government's official list of hanja which may be used in given names. Ji-yoon was the ninth-most popular name for newborn girls in South Korea in 2011.

People with this name include:
Kim Ji-yoon (born 1976), South Korean female basketball player
Park Ji-yoon (born 1982), South Korean female singer
Hwang Ji-yoon (born 1983), South Korean male footballer
Jeon Ji-yoon (born 1990), South Korean female singer, former member of girl group 4Minute

See also
List of Korean given names

References

Korean unisex given names